Beavor is a surname. Notable people with the surname include:

Edmond Beavor (died 1745), British Royal Navy captain
John Beavor-Webb (1849–1927), Irish-American naval architect

See also
 Beaver (surname)
 Beavon
 Beevor